Annapolis High School is a high school located in Dearborn Heights, Michigan,  United States. The school was established in 1967 and first accredited in 1970. Annapolis High School is one of three high schools located in Dearborn Heights, the others being Crestwood High School and Robichaud High School.

History
The school was built in the late 1950s and was known as Best Junior High School. It wasn't until November 29, 1966, at a school board meeting when it was decided that Annapolis High School was to be established. Annapolis opened their doors in Sept. 1967 to approximately 450 students. Annapolis High School was first accredited by the University of Michigan in 1970.

Athletics
In 2002, the high school made headlines when it dropped its football program due to lack of student interest. This happened again in 2012 when the team did not have enough upperclassmen to support a varsity team, and the few varsity players that were left played JV football with the freshmen and sophomores. This resulted in controversy throughout the school's athletic conference.

References

External links
Annapolis High School

Public high schools in Michigan
Schools in Wayne County, Michigan
Educational institutions established in 1967
1967 establishments in Michigan
Dearborn Heights, Michigan